The Looters is a 1967 French film starring Jean Seberg, Serge Gainsbourg and Frederick Stafford. The film was shot in northern Colombia.

It was also known as Estouffade à la Caraïbe and Revolt in the Caribbean.

References

External links

1967 films
French adventure films
Films shot in Colombia
1967 adventure films
1960s French films